Kamillah M. Hanks (born September 4, 1972) is an American politician and New York City Council Member for the 49th District on the North Shore of Staten Island.

District 49 includes the neighborhoods of Arlington, Clifton, Clove Lakes, Concord, Elm Park, Graniteville, Livingston, Mariners Harbor New Brighton Port Richmond, Randall Manor, Rosebank, St. George, Snug Harbor, Silver Lake, Stapleton, Sunnyside, West Brighton and Tompkinsville.

Life and career

Kamillah Hanks is a lifelong resident of Staten Island and a mother of four. Hanks attended  Fiorello H. LaGuardia High School of Music & Art and Performing Arts and studied marketing and finance at the College of Staten Island.

Prior to holding office, Hanks served on the New York City Council Districting Commission, as the Interim President of the Van Duzer Civic Association in Stapleton, and was the former executive director of the Downtown Staten Island Council. She also worked as a public relations consultant at the Staten Island Museum and the Staten Island Economic Development Corporation. In 2012 she founded the Historic Tappen Park Community Partnership, a 501(c)(3) dedicated to the upkeep and development of Tappen Park on Staten Island. In 2014, Hanks was appointed by Staten Island Borough President James Oddo to the New York City Panel for Educational Policy, and served as the Staten Island representative until 2016.

Hanks created the first YouthBuild program on Staten Island, which gives young adults who are unemployed and out of school access to advanced vocational education, leadership development, job training, and essential life skills. In 2020, during the COVID-19 pandemic, she partnered with local small business owners and YouthBuild program participants to develop a program that produced over 5000 face shields that were given to Staten Island firefighters, first responders, and medical personnel in the larger New York City area. 

Hanks also helped found the Minority Women in Business Association of Staten Island in July 2020.

New York City Council

In November 2021, Kamillah Hanks was elected to the New York City Council to represent the 49th District.

Hanks was appointed Chair of the Committee on Public Safety and serves as a member of the Committee on Civil Service and Labor, Committee on Education, Committee on Environmental Protection, Committee on Finance, Committee on Land Use, and the Subcommittee on Zoning and Franchises. As Chair of the Public Safety Committee, Council Member Hanks has chaired hearings on a number of topics, including, the Mayor's Blueprint to End Gun Violence, the Citywide Response to Hate Crimes and Discrimination, and Access to Firearms: City and State Efforts to Curb Gun Violence.

During Women's History Month in 2022, she hosted Staten Island's first Women in Business Expo. The Expo brought attention to women owned businesses on Staten Island and showcased over 60 vendors from local businesses.

During the Fiscal Year 2023 budget season, Hanks worked with fellow Staten Island City Council Members David Carr and Joe Borelli and City Council Speaker Adrienne Adams to secure $7 million in funding for the expansion of Richmond University Medical Center's NICU and PICU.

References 

1972 births
Living people
New York City Council members
21st-century American politicians
21st-century American women politicians
Politicians from Staten Island
Fiorello H. LaGuardia High School alumni
College of Staten Island alumni
New York (state) Democrats
20th-century African-American people
20th-century African-American women
21st-century African-American politicians
21st-century African-American women
African-American women in politics
African-American New York City Council members
Women New York City Council members